Swineford Lock is a canal lock situated on the River Avon, at the village of Swineford, England.

The first cargo of 'Deal boards, Pig-Lead and Meal' arrived in Bath in December 1727. The navigation is now administered by the Canal & River Trust.

In its heyday, between 1709 and 1859 Swineford had an active brass and copper industry which were served by the river which also provided water power for the cloth industry. The mill was later converted into a flock mill.

References

See also

Locks on the Kennet and Avon Canal

Locks on the Kennet and Avon Canal